Corina Schröder (born 15 August 1986) is a German footballer who plays as a left-back most recently for Birmingham City in the FA WSL, having previously played for Liverpool Ladies. Before moving to England she played for FCR 2001 Duisburg, 1. FFC Turbine Potsdam and SC 07 Bad Neuenahr in her native Germany. Nicknamed "Coco", she has also been capped for the Germany women's national under-20 football team.

Club career

Schröder started her professional career in the Bundesliga at FCR 2001 Duisburg. She was a runner-up with Duisburg for four seasons in a row from 2005 to 2008. In the 2008–09 season, Schröder won the UEFA Women's Cup. She also claimed the 2009 German Cup title with Duisburg. After seven seasons at Duisburg, Schröder moved to league rivals 1. FFC Turbine Potsdam for the 2009–10 season. At her new club, she won the Bundesliga title in 2010 and 2011. In the 2009–10 season, Potsdam also claimed the inaugural UEFA Women's Champions League title. For the 2011–12 season she moved to SC 07 Bad Neuenahr.

In February 2013, Schröder signed a contract with Liverpool Ladies in the English FA WSL. Under coach Matt Beard Liverpool won the league title in 2013 and 2014 but were much less successful in 2015, finishing second bottom. Schröder and compatriot Nicole Rolser had extended their contracts with the club in November 2014. She missed three months of the 2015 season with a back injury. In February 2016, after 52 matches played and 2 goals scored (in all competitions) and three years in the club, it was announced she was leaving Liverpool Ladies by mutual consent.

On 7 March 2016, Birmingham City confirmed she signed with the club.

International career
As a youth international Schröder represented Germany at the 2006 FIFA U-20 Women's World Championship in Russia.

Honours
FCR 2001 Duisburg
 UEFA Women's Cup: 2009
 Women's DFB Cup: 2009

1. FFC Turbine Potsdam
 UEFA Women's Champions League: 2010
 Women's Bundesliga: 2010, 2011

Liverpool Ladies
 WSL Women's Super League: 2013, 2014

References

External links

 
 
 
 Player German domestic football stats  at DFB

1986 births
Living people
German women's footballers
Women's Super League players
SC 07 Bad Neuenahr players
Liverpool F.C. Women players
Birmingham City W.F.C. players
1. FFC Turbine Potsdam players
FCR 2001 Duisburg players
Expatriate women's footballers in England
German expatriate sportspeople in England
German expatriate women's footballers
Women's association football defenders